Forberg is a surname. Notable people with the surname include:

Carl Forberg (1911–2000), American race car driver
Cheryl Forberg, American chef
Friedrich Karl Forberg (1770-1848), German philosopher and classical scholar
Leif Erik Forberg (born 1950), Norwegian television presenter